Maurolicus javanicus, also known as the Javan pearlside, is a species of ray-finned fish in the genus Maurolicus. It lives in deep water environments off Java, Australia, and Indonesia. It has 30-31 vertebrae.

References

Fish described in 1993
Sternoptychidae